Skyfire is a 2019 Chinese disaster action film about a volcanic eruption at a resort. It is directed by Simon West, written by Wei Bu and Sidney King, and stars Wang Xueqi, Hannah Quinlivan, Shawn Dou, and Jason Isaacs.

Plot
Young Meng Li loses her mother when a volcano erupts suddenly on the Southeast Asian island of Ting-Hao. As an adult, Meng returns to the island to set up research equipment. Jack Harris has built a resort, claiming that he knows the volcano is not expected to erupt for 150 more years, and believing people like to live on the edge. Meng's father Wentao comes to the island to warn her she should leave because the volcano is about to erupt again. While she wants to stay, she and her father are soon tasked with rescuing a group of tourists observing the volcano from a platform inside the crater. Most of the tourists survive, but Meng and Wentao must save a village from the lava flow. The tourists still at the hotel end up having to leave in a hurry as flaming rocks rain down. Meng and Wentao and the rest of their group face numerous challenges getting to a control center where they can release water from a reservoir and divert the lava. Wentao then finds himself trapped on the wrong side of the lava flow and unable to escape when a helicopter arrives. Later, he joins the others on a ship, explaining that thanks to his daughter's research, he was able to hide in a hole.

Cast 
 Wang Xueqi as Wentao Li
 Hannah Quinlivan as Meng Li
 Shawn Dou as Zhengnan Xiao
 Jason Isaacs as Jack Harris
 Bee Rogers as Young Meng Li

Production
The film is China's first big-budget disaster film, and producer Jennifer Dong expressed hope that it would be a "breakout film" for the genre in China the way The Wandering Earth was for science fiction. The costumes for the movie were designed by Vera Chow. The helmet design for Hannah Quinlivan was provided by the Indian fashion studio The V Renaissance.

Two versions of the movie were filmed, one in Chinese and one in English, but a member of the production team said that the acting was more natural in the Chinese version and thought that the English version would not be used.

Release
Though originally scheduled to be released in July 2019, it debuted in China on December 12, 2019, and ranked #1 at the box office on opening day.

Future
Skyfire was intended to be the first film in a trilogy.

References

External links
 
Official Trailer (English)

2019 films
2019 action films
2010s disaster films
Chinese action films
Chinese disaster films
Disaster action films
Films directed by Simon West
Films scored by Pinar Toprak
2010s Mandarin-language films